The Del Rio League is a high school athletic league that is part of the CIF Southern Section. Members are located around Whittier in Los Angeles County.

Members
 California High School
 El Rancho High School
 La Serna High School
 Santa Fe High School
 Whittier High School

References 

CIF Southern Section leagues